The GE U28B diesel-electric locomotive model replaced the U25B in early 1966, featuring a slightly uprated prime mover (only  more power than the U25B). Early units had the same car body styling as the U25B, while later units had design features (e.g., shortened nose) more in common with later models. After only a year of production, this model was superseded by the U30B.

Trains Magazine editor David P. Morgan wrote about General Electric's decision to go with 2800 horsepower in its 1966 locomotive production. The short article Morgan wrote in the November 1965 issue had line drawings of the proposed short nose U28B.

Original owners

Preservation 
Only two U28B's are in preservation, and one of them has been rebuilt to U30B specs.

Transkentucky Transportation Incorporated 260 is preserved at the Illinois Railway Museum. It was built as Chicago Burlington and Quincy 114 in December 1966.
Vintage Locomotives Inc 5323, originally built as Louisville and Nashville 2504, is preserved at the Southern Appalachia Railway Museum. It was rebuilt to U30B specs late into its career.

References

External links
 Sarberenyi, Robert. GE U28B Original Owners

U28B
B-B locomotives
Diesel-electric locomotives of the United States
Railway locomotives introduced in 1966
Freight locomotives
Standard gauge locomotives of the United States